Nunavik is the northern third of the province of Quebec, Canada.

Nunavik may also refer to:
Nunavik Peninsula, a large peninsula in northwestern Greenland
Nunavik (ship), an icebreaking bulk carrier

See also
Nunavut, a territory of Canada
Nunatsiavut, an autonomous area in Newfoundland and Labrador, Canada
Abitibi—Baie-James—Nunavik—Eeyou, a Quebec electoral district